Rancho Alto is Jason Boland & The Stragglers's seventh studio album. It was produced by Lloyd Maines and released in October 2011 on the Apex music label in collaboration with Thirty Tigers and Proud Souls Entertainment.

Track listing
"Down Here In The Hole" (Boland) - 3:10
"Every Moment I'm Gone" (Boland) - 5:05
"False Accuser's Lament" (Boland) - 4:27
"Between 11 And 2" (Boland, Jeffries) - 4:36
"Pushing Luck" - (Boland, Jeffries) 3:40
"Fences" (Boland) - 3:34
"Mary Ellen's Greenhouse" (Boland) - 3:47
"Obsessed" (Boland) - 4:13
"Woody's Road" (Childers)- 4:08
"Forever Together Again" (Ray) - 4:31
"Farmer's Luck" (Jacobs) - 6:47

Personnel
Jason Boland - Vocals, Guitar 
Roger Ray - Pedal Steel, Dobro
Grant Tracy - Bass
Brad Rice - Drums
Noah Jeffries - Fiddle, Mandolin
Jeremy Watkins - Fiddle
Lloyd Maines - Banjo, Dulcimer, Guitar
Mikey Hudson - Percussion
Aaron Lain - Percussion
Riley Osbourne - Organ, Piano
Coby Wier - Guitar

Chart performance

References

External links

Jason Boland & The Stragglers albums
2011 albums